Fine Line is the second studio album by English singer and songwriter Harry Styles, released on 13 December 2019 by Columbia Records and Erskine. The album's themes revolve around breakups, happiness, sex and sadness. The record has been described as pop rock, with elements of progressive-pop, psychedelic pop, folk, soul, funk and indie pop. It was primarily written with and produced by frequent collaborator Tyler Johnson and Kid Harpoon.

Supported by seven singles—"Lights Up", "Adore You", "Falling", "Watermelon Sugar", "Golden", "Treat People with Kindness", and the title track—the album debuted at number three on the UK Albums Chart and has since been certified platinum. It debuted at number one on the Billboard 200, making it Styles' second consecutive number-one album in the US. The album had the third-largest sales week of 2019 in the US and broke the record as the biggest debut from a British male artist since Nielsen SoundScan began, earning 478,000 album-equivalent units. It has been certified triple platinum in the US for combined sales and album-equivalent units of over three million units in the country.

Fine Line received generally positive reviews from music critics, particularly towards its production and stylistic influences. It was nominated for Album of the Year at the 2020 Brit Awards, and for Best Pop Vocal Album at the 2021 Grammy Awards. The album received a Grammy Award for Best Pop Solo Performance and a Brit Award for British Single of the Year for "Watermelon Sugar". In 2020, Rolling Stone ranked it number 491 on its list of the 500 Greatest Albums of All Time, making it the most recent album to be included.

Background 
In an interview with Rolling Stone released on 26 August 2019, it was reported that the singer was putting the "final touches" on his album which Styles explained was "all about having sex and feeling sad." The album was also described to contain his "toughest, most soulful songs he's written yet." On the direction of his second album, Styles revealed he wanted to be more fun and adventurous compared to his self-titled debut album.

Much of the album was inspired by Styles' relationship with model Camille Rowe. Following the couple's split, producer and writer Kid Harpoon encouraged Styles to deal with his emotions by writing about them. During the recording Styles was inspired by David Bowie, Van Morrison, Paul McCartney and Joni Mitchell. The latter's album Blue (1971) and its use of the dulcimer, particularly influenced the album's musical style. Styles tracked down the woman who built the dulcimer used in Mitchell's album and requested lessons; she would go on to build Styles his own dulcimer which was used during the album's recording. Styles used "mushrooms" during the recording process.

Release and promotion 
The album was released on 13 December 2019, by Columbia and Erskine, Styles' second to be released under the label. The standard edition was released on CD, vinyl, digital download and streaming. The deluxe edition of the album was released on CD on 13 December 2019.
Shortly before release of the album's lead single "Lights Up", the album was promoted by billboards and the caption: "Do You Know Who You Are?" in several cities around the world.
Marketing for a tourism agency in Eroda, the fictitious isle Styles' team came up with, began appearing on social media; as well as a website for the isle. Styles collaborated with Spotify to organize a fan-exclusive event held at an undisclosed location in Los Angeles for a private listening party, where fans were taken to experience Eroda, an elaborate theme created for his single "Adore You".

Styles promoted the album on 16 November episode of NBC's Saturday Night Live as both a host and a musical guest.
Leading up to the album's release, on 10 December, Styles also served as the guest host on The Late Late Show with James Corden. To celebrate the release and maximize sales of the album, Styles held a one-night-only show at The Forum in Los Angeles that coincided with the album's 13 December release. Styles allowed fans to pre-order his album and rewarded them with a code to have a chance to buy tickets to see him at his one-night-only show for only $25. The show in Los Angeles was followed by another show at the Electric Ballroom in London on 19 December with British rapper Stormzy as a special guest. The planned concert tour, Love On Tour, in support of the album, was postponed due to the COVID-19 pandemic; the dates of the US leg of the tour were later rescheduled for fall 2021.

Singles 
"Lights Up", the lead single from the album, was released on 11 October 2019, debuting at number 3 on the UK Singles Chart. The song features a "soft-touch re-entry into the pop slipstream", according to music writer Jon Caramanica. The song debuted at number 17 on the Billboard Hot 100.

On 2 December, Styles revealed the trailer for the album's second single, "Adore You". The song and music video were released on 6 December, with the extended version of the music video being narrated by Rosalía. "Adore You" peaked at number six on the Billboard Hot 100, becoming his first top-ten single in the country since his solo debut single, "Sign of the Times". In the singer's native, the United Kingdom, the song peaked at number seven.

A music video for "Falling" was released on 28 February. On 7 March 2020, "Falling" was officially released as the third single of the album in the UK. Peaking at number 15 on the UK Singles Chart, the song became Styles third consecutive top-fifteen single from the album. Moreover, it peaked at number 62 on the Billboard Hot 100.

"Watermelon Sugar" was released as the album's fourth single on 15 May 2020. It was originally released as a promotional single on 16 November 2019; Styles performed "Watermelon Sugar" on Saturday Night Live. Peaking at number four on the UK Singles Chart, the song became Styles third top-ten single from the album. Additionally, it peaked at number one in the US, making it his first number one single in the country.

"Golden" impacted UK contemporary hit radio on 23 October 2020, and later to US adult pop radio formats on 26 October 2020 and Top 40 on the following day as the album's fifth single.

On 1 January 2021, Styles released a music video for "Treat People with Kindness" co-starring actress Phoebe Waller-Bridge. The song later impacted UK radio on 9 January 2021 as the album's sixth single.

Musical style 
Fine Line is primarily a pop rock record that incorporates elements of progressive pop, psychedelic pop, folk, soul, funk and indie pop.

Critical reception 

Fine Line received generally positive reviews from critics. At Metacritic, which assigns a normalized rating out of 100 to reviews from professional critics, the album has an average score of 76 out of 100, based on 20 reviews.

Gregory Robinson, writing for The Guardian, regarded the album as "confident, convincing and catchy." Alexandra Pollard of The Independent stated that "it may not reach the pinnacle of sex or sadness, but Fine Line is a fine album nonetheless." Hannah Mylrea of NME found the album to be "a total joy", calling it "an elegant combination of the ex-boybander's influences, slick modern pop and his own roguish charm." Rea McNamara of NOW Magazine praised Styles' decision to lean towards "ebullient, soulful pop" while naming "Sunflower, Vol. 6" as the album's best track. Writing for Rolling Stone, Nick Catucci deemed the album "excellent" and felt that "if there's a nontoxic masculinity, Harry Styles just might've found it." David Smyth of The Evening Standard remarked that while Styles' music can not "live up to the sparkling imagery of his press profiles", his second album makes "a strong argument for being the most interesting boy band escapee yet."

Jon Pareles of The New York Times described the production as a "tour-de-force" and complimented how "Styles exults in sound, not image." Chris Willman of Variety commented that, contrary to Style's description of the record, the sensuality and melancholy are "a little on the muted side", while Styles is "still stuck" in the classic rock era that he "casually [claims] as his own." Bryan Rolli of Consequence of Sound called Fine Line an "airy, melancholy album that diplomatically addresses heartache while declining to wallow in it", complimenting his more honest songwriting but lamenting the lack of energy in his vocal performance. The Daily Telegraph Neil McCormick characterized the album as "charming but inconsequential", while Mark Richardson of The Wall Street Journal described it as "earnest, forthright and delivered with polish", but "more imitative than original" and offering "no fresh perspective". In a mixed review, Jeremy D. Larson of Pitchfork described the "actual sound" of Fine Line as "incredible" as Styles' influences permeate the record, but considered his songwriting shallow and lacking in imagination. Tom Hull wrote similarly that it "seems pointless even when he comes up with something catchy – actually, the catchier, the more annoying it gets."

Year-end lists

All-time lists

Accolades

Commercial performance 
Fine Line debuted atop the US Billboard 200 with 478,000 album-equivalent units (of which 393,000 are pure sales) in the week ending 19 December. It marked the biggest week for a pop album by a male artist in over four years. Fine Line also achieved the largest sales week from a British male artist since Nielsen SoundScan began, and made him the first UK male artist to debut at number one with first two albums. The album's tracks earned a total of 108.7 million on-demand US streams in its first week. In its second week, the album remained at number one on the chart, selling an additional 89,000 album equivalent units consisting of 47,000 pure album sales, and becoming the first pop album to spend two weeks at number one since Ed Sheeran's No.6 Collaborations Project in August 2019. According to Nielsen year-end report, Fine Line was the fifth-best selling album of the year in pure sales, with 458,000 copies—of which 354,000 were physical copies. In its third week, the album dropped to number four on the chart, earning 54,000 more units that week. In its fourth week, the album climbed to number three on the chart, earning 49,000 more units. On 15 February 2022, the album was certified triple platinum by the Recording Industry Association of America (RIAA) for combined sales and album-equivalent units of three million units in the United States. Fine Line is one of only three albums released in 2019 to have sold a million copies in traditional album sales in the US.

After debuting at number 3 on the UK Album Charts in December 2019, the album peaked at number 2 in its 56th week in the top 100 on 14 January 2021 (week ending) behind Taylor Swift's Evermore. On 16 October 2020, it was certified platinum by the British Phonographic Industry (BPI) for selling over 300,000 units in the UK. The album has shifted over 500.000 units to date in the UK.

Track listing

Personnel 
Credits adapted from the album's liner notes.

Musicians
 Harry Styles – lead vocals (all tracks), background vocals (tracks 1–10, 12), dulcimer (track 10), acoustic guitar (track 12)
 Kid Harpoon (Thomas Hull) – production (tracks 2–3, 6–8, 10, 12), co-production (track 1), additional production (tracks 4, 5), electric guitar (tracks 2–4, 8, 10), acoustic guitar (tracks 1, 2, 10, 12), background vocals (tracks 1, 2, 7), moog bass (tracks 1, 6, 7), piano (tracks 2, 6, 8), bass (tracks 3, 5, 10), keyboards (tracks 3, 8, 10), drums (tracks 3, 9), drum programming (track 3), organ (track 6)
 Tyler Johnson – production (tracks 1, 2, 4, 5, 7, 12), co-production (tracks 3, 8), additional production (tracks 6, 10), keyboards (tracks 1–5, 12), background vocals (tracks 1, 2, 4, 7), drum programming (tracks 3, 4), drums, bass & acoustic guitar (track 4), programming & electric guitar (track 5), piano & moog bass (track 12)
 Mitch Rowland – electric guitar (tracks 1, 2, 7, 8, 10, 12), drums (tracks 1, 2, 7, 8, 12), slide guitar (tracks 1, 2, 5, 10), acoustic guitar (tracks 7, 10), glockenspiel (track 1), background vocals (track 7)
 Greg Kurstin – production, bass, drums, guitar, organ, clav & electric sitar (track 9)
 Jeff Bhasker – piano (tracks 8, 11), production, strings arrangement, strings conducting, background vocals, mellotron (track 11)
 Ivan Jackson – horns (tracks 2, 4, 12)
 Jon Castelli – drum programming (track 7)
 Aaron Sterling – drums (tracks 5, 7), percussion (track 7)
 Gabe Noel – cello, double bass & sarangi (track 7)
 Morgan Kibby – keyboards, moog bass & background vocals (track 12)
 Leo Abrahams – electric guitar (tracks 1, 6)
 Pino Palladino– bass (tracks 2, 8)
 Davey Chegwidden – percussion (tracks 2, 10)
 Jason White – choir contracting (track 4), choir conducting (track 11)
 Nikki Grier (Nikisha Daniel) – choir vocals (tracks 4, 11)
 Tiffany Smith – choir vocals (tracks 4, 11)
 Tiffany Stevenson – choir vocals (tracks 4, 11)
 Brandon Winbush – choir vocals (tracks 4, 11)
 David Campbell – strings arrangement (track 5), orchestra arrangement (track 12)
 Sarah Jones – background vocals (track 2)
 Amy Allen – background vocals (track 3)
 Ian Fitchuk – congas (track 4)
 James Gadson – drums (track 8)
 John Carroll Kirby – keyboards (track 10)
 Jess Wolfe – vocals (track 11)
 Holly Laessig – vocals (track 11)
 Jason Morales – choir vocals (track 11)
 Nick Movshon – bass (track 11)
 Laurence Juber – electric guitar (track 11)
 Homer Steinweiss – drums (track 11)
 Serena Goransson – violin (track 11)
 Tereza Stanislav – violin (track 11)
 Jonathan Moerschel – viola (track 11)
 Jacob Braun – cello (track 11)
 Elizabeth Pupo-Walker – congas (track 11)
Technical

 Jeremy Hatcher – engineering (tracks 3, 4), engineering assistance (tracks 1, 5, 7, 8)
 Oli Jacobs – engineering assistance (tracks 1, 2, 5, 7, 12)
 Oli Middleton – engineering assistance (tracks 1, 2, 5, 7, 12)
 Jon Castelli – additional engineering (tracks 1, 7), mixing (track 4)
 Rob Bisel – engineering (track 5), engineering assistance (tracks 1, 5, 8)
 Kevin Smith – engineering assistance (tracks 1, 5, 7, 8)
 Tyler Beans – engineering assistance (tracks 1, 5, 8)
 Dylan Neustadter – engineering assistance (tracks 1, 5, 8)
 Nick Lobel – engineering (tracks 2, 4), additional engineering (tracks 1, 7), mixing (track 7)
 Mark Rankin – engineering (tracks 2, 5, 7, 8), additional engineering (track 1)
 Matt Tuggle – engineering assistance (tracks 2–4)
 Dan Ewins – engineering assistance (tracks 2, 6, 12)
 Kid Harpoon (Thomas Hull) – engineering (track 3)
 Tyler Johnson – engineering (track 4), mixing (track 7)
 Matthew Wallick – engineering assistance (track 4)
 Ingmar Carlson – mixing assistance (track 4)
 Greg Kurstin – engineering (track 9)
 Julian Burg – engineering (track 9)
 Alex Pasco – engineering (track 9)
 Jens Jungkurth – engineering (track 11)
 Ryan Nasci – engineering (track 11)
 Randy Merrill – mastering

Art
 Molly Hawkins – creative director
 Hélène Pambrun – photography
 Tim Walker – photography
 Bradley Pinkerton – graphic design

Charts

Weekly charts

Year-end charts

Certifications and sales

Release history

References 

2019 albums
Harry Styles albums
Albums produced by Jeff Bhasker
Albums produced by Greg Kurstin
Albums recorded at Shangri-La (recording studio)
Columbia Records albums
Juno Award for International Album of the Year albums
Pop rock albums by English artists